Fields Corner station is a rapid transit station on the Ashmont branch of the Massachusetts Bay Transportation Authority (MBTA) Red Line, located in the Fields Corner district of Dorchester, Boston, Massachusetts. It serves as a major transfer point for MBTA bus service. The station opened in 1927 and was completely rebuilt from 2004 to 2008, making it fully accessible.

History

Fields Corner and  stations opened on November 5, 1927. Fields Corner was the southern terminus of the line for about a year until  and  opened in 1928. The elevated station was designed for efficient transfer between rapid transit trains and surface streetcars and buses. It had two island platforms with the rapid transit tracks in the center and the streetcar tracks on the outside (two tracks on the north side). A busway (later closed) was located at ground level on the south side of the station.

The pedestrian tunnel from Charles Street was controversially closed in January 1970 due to crime and vandalism. In the mid-1980s, the platforms were extended for six-car trains, which were introduced in 1988.

The MBTA issued a $4.3 million design contract for renovations of Ashmont, Shawmut, and Fields Corner stations on May 3, 2001. Shawmut and Fields Corner reached 100% design by January 10, 2003; Ashmont was delayed due to design changes. The MBTA broke ground for the Red Line Rehabilitation Project - a $67 million reconstruction of Shawmut, Fields Corner, and Savin Hill stations - in October 2003. 

Construction began in March 2004. The renovations changed the layout of the station, with a new fare lobby under the tracks. Original plans to include public art as part of the Arts on the Line program were removed in budget cuts; only historical interpretive panels were installed. The new entrance lobby opened on December 22, 2006, making it the final fare-controlled station on the MBTA to be converted to use the CharlieCard-based automated fare collection system. The station renovation was completed on September 23, 2008.

Bus connections

Fields Corner is a major MBTA bus transfer point serviced by seven local routes and limited service route 191:
: Fields Corner station or Kane Square–
: Fields Corner station–
: Ashmont station–Andrew station
: Fields Corner station– or Ruggles station
 –
: Fields Corner Loop via Neponset Avenue
: Fields Corner Loop via Adams Street
: –Fields Corner station

References

External links

MBTA - Fields Corner
 Charles Street entrance from Google Maps Street View

Dorchester, Boston
Red Line (MBTA) stations
Railway stations in Boston
Railway stations in the United States opened in 1927
Stations along Old Colony Railroad lines